Orlen Unipetrol is a Czech joint stock company owned by a Polish oil company PKN Orlen. The company is engaged in crude oil processing and the production, distribution, and sales of fuels and petrochemical products – mainly plastics and fertilisers – in the Czech Republic and the Central European region. It is the only crude oil processing company in the Czech Republic, and its earnings rank it among the ten largest Czech companies. It was founded in 1994, and in 2004, it became part of the PKN Orlen group, which owns 100% shares in the company. The following companies have been gradually incorporated into Unipetrol: Kaučuk, Chemopetrol, Benzina, Paramo, Koramo(merged with Paramoin 2003), Česká rafinérská, Unipetrol Trade, Spolana, and Unipetrol Rafinérie. The Unipetrol group includes refineries and production plants in Litvínov and Kralupy nad Vltavou, Paramo in Pardubice and Kolín with its Mogul brand and Spolana in Neratovice, and two research centres in Litvínov and Brno. The network of Benzina fuel stations – the largest network in the Czech Republic with its 406 stations – is also part of Unipetrol.

Since 2018, the Chairman of the Board has been Krzysztof Zdziarski.

Unipetrol group history 
The beginning of the Unipetrol group dates back to 1939, when the development of the STW chemical plant in Záluží u Litvínova was initiated. In 1975–1976, polypropylene and polyethylene production plants were commissioned, and the ethylene unit was put into operation in 1979. Two years later, the development of a new refinery in Litvínov (NRL) was completed. The year 1993 saw the restructuring of the refinery-petrochemical industry, including Chemopetrol at that time, which was later incorporated into Unipetrol.

Unipetrol was founded in 1994 by the National Property Fund in one of the stages of the privatisation of the Czech petrochemical industry. In 1996, the Chemopetrol refineries in Litvínov and Kaučuk in Kralupy were separated into a company called Česká rafinérská.

Privatisation

In 2001, Zeman’s government decided to initiate the privatisation process of the majority state share. Although the joint privatisation committee suggested the winner should be the British company RotchEnergy, which offered 444 mil. euro (about 14.5 bil. CZK), in December 2001 the government decided to sell it to the Czech company Agrofert for 361 mil. euro (about 11.7 bil. CZK at that time). Agrofert however never paid for the transaction and asked for the privatisation agreement to be terminated; therefore Špidla’s government decided on a new public tender in November 2002.

In January 2004, seven companies or syndicates made a preliminary offer in the privatisation tender. From the six valid bids, the offers by the Slovakian Penta Finance, Russian Tatněft and Kazakh state-owned company KazMunaiGas (which offered the highest ceiling within 9-16 bil. CZK) were rejected. The government selected only the preliminary offers of the Polish company PKN Orlen (supported by Agrofert), the Hungarian MOL, and Shell for the short list. The final offer was then filed by PKN Orlen alone – 11.3 bil. CZK for a 63% share in Unipetrol and 1.7 bil. CZK for the claims of ČKA against Unipetrol companies. This offer was accepted by the government in April 2004, and the sale was completed in 2005.

The present 
In April 2015, the transaction related to the purchase of a 32.445% share in Česká rafinérská from the company Eni International B. V. was successfully completed. Unipetrol thus became the sole shareholder of Česká rafinérská.

In December 2015, Unipetrol RPA, represented on the retail market by the Benzina trademark, entered into an agreement with OMV on the takeover of 68 fuel stations in the Czech Republic.

As part of the restructuring of the Unipetrol group, Unipetrol RPA and Benzina were merged under the name Unipetrol RPA at the end of 2015. Benzina thus started to operate as a branch office.

In June 2016, Unipetrol RPA signed an agreement on the purchase of shares from Anwil, thanks to which it acquired a 100% share in the company Spolana.

Socially beneficial activities and sponsoring

In 2016, Unipetrol RPA founded the Unipetrol Foundation, which is oriented towards study and education in the chemical and technical fields. Unipetrol supports the development of the educational system and the regions in which it operates in. On a long-term basis, Unipetrol together with its employees gives financial support to non-profit organisations and children’s homes through the collection called Splněná přání (Fulfilled Wishes). Since 2011, it has distributed more than 1.5 million crowns. In addition, it distributes millions to municipalities in its vicinity every year. The funds are used by the municipalities for the development of their infrastructure and activities in the social sphere, culture, social life and sports.

The company has a long-term tradition of introducing fish to the Bílina and Elbe rivers. Since 2010, fishermen together with Unipetrol have introduced more than 4,500 kilograms of fish. More than 2,000 kg of fish has been introduced by fishermen into a tributary of the Elbe since 2013. In cooperation with the ecological organisation Alka Wildlife, Unipetrol takes care of the peregrine falcons which nest every year on chimneys in the production complexes in Litvínov, Kralupy nad Vltavou and Neratovice. In 2018, beehives were installed in the complex of the old chocolate and saccharine production plant in Spolana Neratovice. The high quality of the extracted floral honey was confirmed by tests run by an accredited laboratory of the Bee Research Institute.

Since 2002, Unipetrol has been a strategic partner of the University of Chemistry and Technology Prague. In 2015, the University Centre of UCT Prague – Unipetrol was established, with its registered office in the production complex of Unipetrol in Litvínov, at which both Bachelor’s and Master’s can be studied. Unipetrol also gives financial support to secondary schools and their students, in particular the ScholaHumanitas schools in Litvínov and EDUCHEM in Meziboří u Litvínova.

Science and research

Unipetrol emphasises research and development in the refinery and petrochemical areas. It collaborates with many domestic and foreign expert worksites both on school premises and in the commercial sphere. The Unipetrol group includes two research and educational centres oriented towards refinery products (Litvínov) and petrochemical products (Brno)

UniCRE - http://www.unicre.cz/

In 2014, the Unipetrol výzkumně vzdělávací centrum, a.s. (UniCRE – research and educational centre) was established at the chemical plant complex in Litvínov. It connects research with education and industrial practices and thus follows the almost 70-year tradition of research on chemical technologies in Litvínov and Ústí nad Labem. In addition to researchers, these modern facilities and their state-of-the-art equipment are used by students from the University Centre of UCT Prague. Through its research and education activities, UniCRE facilitates the transfer of know-how from the research sphere to practice and supports significantly the level of education in the Ústí Region.

PIB - http://www.polymer.cz/

The Polymer Institut Brno (PIB) branch office has the status of a research, development and production organisation operating on a contract basis. In addition to research and development activities, it deals with the production of additive concentrates for plastics (colour concentrates, stabiliser concentrates, special compositors, materials with reduced inflammability, antistatic agents, nucleation and sliding agents, filling agents, etc.), sales of polymers, and information and consulting services.

Subsidiaries 
Unipetrol subsidiaries include:

Unipetrol RPA, s.r.o. (100%)
Unipetrol RPA, s.r.o. – RAFINÉRIE, branch office
Unipetrol RPA, s.r.o. – Benzina, branch office
Unipetrol RPA, s.r.o. – POLYMER INSTITUTE BRNO, branch office
HC Verva Litvínov, a.s.
Spolana a.s.
Unipetrol RPA Hungary Kft.
Petrotrans, s.r.o.
Unipetrol Doprava, s.r.o.
Unipetrol Slovensko s.r.o.
Universal Banka, a.s.
Unipetrol Deutschland GmbH

Incidents
March 22, 2018: An explosion at a Unipetrol plant in Kralupy nad Vltavou killed 6.

See also

Energy in the Czech Republic
Česká Rafinérská

References

External links

Unipetrol - company website

Oil and gas companies of the Czech Republic
Czech brands
Companies based in Prague
Energy companies established in 1994
Czech companies established in 1994